En-men-lu-ana  appears as the first king of Bad-tibira in some version of the Sumerian King List. The list claims that En-men-lu-ana ruled for 43,200 years, and succeeded by Dumuzid the Shepard. The kings on the early part of the SKL are usually not considered historical, except when they are mentioned in contemporary documents. En-men-lu-ana is not one of them.

References 

Antediluvian Sumerian kings